Something to Believe In is the second studio album by the Swedish singer Anna Bergendahl released on 24 October 2012 on Lionheart International as a follow up to her first Yours Sincerely (2010).

Track list

Charts

Release history

References

2012 albums
Universal Music Group albums
Anna Bergendahl albums